Davide Raffaello (born 24 April 1988) is an Italian football player who plays for Serie D club San Nicolò Notaresco.

Club career
He made his professional debut in the Serie B for Ascoli in the 2007–08 season.

On 29 January 2019, he was released from his contract with FeralpiSalò by mutual consent. He remained without club until December 2019, where he signed with Serie D club San Nicolò Notaresco.

References

External links
 
 

1988 births
Footballers from Lazio
People from Latina, Lazio
Living people
Italian footballers
Latina Calcio 1932 players
Ascoli Calcio 1898 F.C. players
F.C. Esperia Viareggio players
A.C. Isola Liri players
Lupa Roma F.C. players
Trapani Calcio players
FeralpiSalò players
Serie B players
Serie C players
Serie D players
Association football midfielders
Sportspeople from the Province of Latina